Cold River Virgin Forest a virgin hemlock-northern hardwood forest in northwestern Massachusetts.  Believed to be the only stand of its type in New England, it was designated a National Natural Landmark by the National Park Service in April 1980.

It is located within Mohawk Trail State Forest nine miles southeast of North Adams in Berkshire and Franklin counties. The forest features hemlocks and sugar maples exceeding 400 years in age.

See also
List of National Natural Landmarks in Massachusetts
List of Massachusetts State Parks
List of old growth forests in Massachusetts

References

Protected areas of Berkshire County, Massachusetts
Protected areas of Franklin County, Massachusetts
National Natural Landmarks in Massachusetts
Charlemont, Massachusetts
Forests of Massachusetts
Old-growth forests